Anders Thiodolf Saelan (Sælan) (born 20 November 1834 in Lappeenranta; died 24 June 1921 in Helsinki) was a Finnish physician and botanist. He reformed Finnish mental health care during his decades as chief physician of Lapinlahti Psychiatric Hospital in Helsinki.

Life and career

Saelan's parents were Anders Johan Saelan (1795–1841), pastor of Jämsä, and Antoinette Henrietta Kristina Müller. He attended Porvoo Upper Secondary School (1844–1848) and Porvoo High School (1848–1851) and became a university student in 1851. Saelan graduated from the University of Helsinki with a bachelor's degree in physical mathematics in 1855 and a master's degree in 1857. Saelan studied in Stockholm from 1860 to 1861. He became a Bachelor of Medicine in 1859 and a licentiate and Doctor of Medicine and Surgery in 1865. He later became a Master of Joy (Riemumaisteri, an honorary degree awarded to those working for 50 years since receiving a master's degree) and Honorary Doctor of Philosophy in 1907 and a Doctor of Joy in 1917.

Saelan worked at Lapinlahti Psychiatric Hospital as a resident from 1865 to 1868 and as an attorney general from 1868 to 1904. His dissertation Om självmordet i Finland i statistiskt och rättsmedicinskt hänseende ("About suicide in Finland in statistical and forensic terms") was the first Finnish study to deal with suicides from a medical point of view. He was awarded the title of professor in 1877. For several decades, he was Finland's most important expert in psychiatry and mental health care.

Botanical work
Saelan's other field was botany, where he was also one of the most important Finnish researchers of his time. He published more than 100 papers on the floristics (plant geography) of Finland. He was an avid botanist and spent much of his time in the Lapinlahti hospital park. Saelan, at the time a young graduate, collaborated with William Nylander to publish Herbarium Musei fennici in 1859. This was a catalogue of the specimens in the herbarium of the botanical museum. Nylander wrote about the cryptogams, while Saelen dealt with the phanerogams. This catalogue listed 1,025 species of vascular plants, 333 mosses, 316 lichens, 71 algae, and 375 fungi.

The moss genus Saelania is named in honour of Thiodolf Saelan.

Personal
Thiodolf Saelan was married in 1873 to Naema Lovisa Vivika von Knorring (1850–1920). They had four children: Gertrud Maria (1875–1911), Karl Thorvald (1878–1959), Eva Johanna Paersch (1883–1966), and Sigyn Naemi Lindberg (1888–1965).

Selected works

References

Cited literature

 

1834 births
1921 deaths
19th-century Finnish botanists
20th-century Finnish botanists
Finnish psychiatrists
19th-century Finnish physicians
20th-century Finnish physicians
Swedish-speaking Finns
People from Lappeenranta
University of Helsinki alumni